Medina Province is one of the 15 provinces in the Cundinamarca Department, Colombia. Medina borders to the west the Guavio Province, to the north, northeast and east the Boyacá Department and to the southeast and south the Meta Department.

Medina contains two municipalities:
 Medina 
 Paratebueno

References

External links 
  Medina Province in Cundinamarca

Provinces of Cundinamarca Department